Frances Manners may refer to:

Frances Manners, Baroness Bergavenny (died 1576), née Neville
Frances Manners, Duchess of Rutland (born 1937)
Frances Cecil, Countess of Exeter (died 1669) (1630–1669), née Manners
Frances Carpenter, Countess of Tyrconnel (1753–1792), née Manners